WSEN may refer to:

 WSEN (FM), a radio station (103.9 MHz) licensed to serve Mexico, New York, United States
 WBVG, a defunct radio station (1050 kHz) formerly licensed to serve Baldwinsville, New York, which held the call sign WSEN from 1959 to 1993 and from 2003 to 2017
 WOLF-FM, a radio station (92.1 MHz) licensed to serve Baldwinsville, which used the call sign WSEN-FM from 1967 to 2016